Unregistered cohabitation is a legal status (sometimes de facto) given to same-sex or opposite-sex couples in certain jurisdictions. They may be similar to common-law marriages.

More specifically, unregistered cohabitation may refer to:
 Unregistered cohabitation in Australia and De facto relationships in Australia
 Domestic relationships and domestic partnerships in the Australian Capital Territory
 Domestic relationships in New South Wales
 De facto unions in the Northern Territory
 De facto unions in Norfolk Island
 De facto relationships in Queensland
 Close personal relationships in South Australia
 Personal relationships in Tasmania
 Domestic relationships in Victoria
 De facto unions in Western Australia
 Various de facto relationships in Canada
 Adult interdependent relationship in Alberta
 Common-law relationships in Manitoba
 Domestic partnership in Nova Scotia
 Civil unions and de facto relationships in Quebec
 De facto unions in Colombia
 Unregistered cohabitation in Croatia
 Unregistered cohabitation in Israel
 Samenlevingscontract in the Netherlands
 De facto relationships in New Zealand
 Unregistered cohabitation in Poland
 Unregistered cohabitation in San Marino
 Unregistered cohabitation in Spain

Some other countries and sub-national regions recognize unregistered cohabitation, as listed in the Civil union article.

Notes

See also
Common-law marriage

Interpersonal relationships
Family law
State recognition of same-sex relationships